Lucas Barbosa may refer to:

Lucas Barbosa (footballer, born 1996), Brazilian footballer
Lucas Barbosa (footballer, born 2001), Brazilian footballer
Lucas Barbosa (gymnast) (born 1994), Brazilian aerobic gymnast 
Lucas Barbosa (martial artist) (born 1992), Brazilian martial artist